Credito Valtellinese (known as Creval) was an Italian bank based in Sondrio (in Lombardy, Italy) prior to its acquisition by Crédit Agricole Italia in  2021. The company was a former component of FTSE Italia Mid Cap Index of the Borsa Italiana (Milan Stock Exchange), but was removed and added as a component of  Index in May 2017; the bank was added back to the reserve list of FTSE Italia Mid Cap in August 2017.

The bank was named after the area Valtellina. The bank had 363 branches in Northern Italy (as Credito Valtellinese), 40 branches in Marche and Umbria (former Carifano), and 133 branches in Sicily (as Credito Siciliano). Credito Siciliano had three more branches outside the island of Sicily.

It had a market share of 32% in Sondrio. However, only 2.9% in whole Lombardy region in terms of deposits, as of 30 June 2014, as well as only 1.7% in terms of branches as the 10th of Italy.

Since 2021, it is part of Crédit Agricole Italia after a successful takeover bid by Crédit Agricole Italia. Crédit Agricole successfully concludes the tender offer, acquiring 91.17% of the shares in Creval, for a cost of 855 million. The delisting from the Italian Stock Exchange took place on Friday 4 June 2021 following the success of the residual takeover bid and the consequent "squeeze-out", which led Crédit Agricole to hold 100% of the capital of Creval.

History
Credito Valtellinese is a former co-operative bank based in Sondrio found in 1908, as Banca Piccolo Credito Valtellinese. (Not to be confused with Banca Popolare di Sondrio) The bank expanded by the acquisition of Technoleasing (later Bancaperta) in the 1980s, and Credito Artigiano in 1996, which was the parent company of Banca dell'Artigianato e dell'Industria. In 2002, Sicilian banks Banca Popolare Santa Venera in Acireale, Cassa San Giacomo in Caltagirone and Banca Regionale Sant'Angelo were merged to become Credito Siciliano. In 2008, Credito Piemontese, Cassa di Risparmio di Fano, Banca Cattolica di Montefiascone and Credito del Lazio (former Banca della Ciociaria) joined.

From 2004 to 2013, Creval was a minority shareholder of Banca di Cividale.

In 2016, the bank was demutualized, being registered as a Banca Popolare. The new Italian Law N°3/2015 required that banks with more than €8 billion total assets in that category had to be transformed into a società per azioni. The withdrawal price for the shareholders was set at €0.4747 per share. At the same time a plan to combine 10 old shares to 1 new share was announced.

Equity investments
Credito Valtellinese was a minority shareholder of Global Assistance S.p.A. (40%), a subsidiary of Ri-Fin; Creval and Ri-Fin were the shareholders of Global Assicurazioni (60–40) and Global Broker (51–49). The bank was a minority shareholder of Unione Fiduciaria.

Shareholders

Declared shareholder of the bank are:
 Credit Agricole S.A. (5%)
 Hosking Partners LLP (5.13%)
 Algebris Limited (5.29%)
 DGFD SA (5.78%)
 Altera Absolute Investments (7.07%)

References

External links

 Official Site 
 Group website 

 
Banks of Italy
Companies based in Sondrio
Banks established in 1908
Italian companies established in 1908
Former cooperative banks of Italy